Diary (tr. Yoman) is a 1983 Israeli experimental independent documentary art film directed by David Perlov, notable for being, together with its three follow-ups, פגישות עם נתן זך  ,יומן מעודכן ,1990–1999 and תצלומי 2002–1952, the last based on his photography of fifty years, and one of the longest films ever made. It was released on DVD by Re:Voir Vidéo in 2006, and is considered by some to be the greatest and most important Israeli film ever made in its home country.

Synopsis
In early 1973, Perlov bought a 16 mm film camera. Told in eleven parts, the film focuses on the life of Perlov and his family in the years 1952–2002, showcasing his life and the developments in area politics, while Perlov himself narrates. Several portions show Perlov visiting São Paulo, his place of origin.

Release
It was released on cable television in Israel and on Channel 4. It also was shown in Israeli theaters, in the Museum of Modern Art (MOMA) in New York City, and in the Centre Georges Pompidou in Paris.

References

Further reading
דוד פרלוב, מאת יכין הירש, נדפס בקשת החדשה, 7, 2004. 
דוד פרלוב: יומן ויומיום, מאת מאיר ויגודר, נדפס בתיאוריה וביקורת, 18, 2001. 
צילום רחוב והיומיום - פרלוב כעובר אורח, מאת מאיר ויגודר, נדפס בסטודיו, 113, 2000. 
פרלוב אמן קולנוע של תשוקה, מאת יגאל בורשטיין, נדפס במאזנים, ע"ד, 1, 1999. 
2010 הפואטיקה של הבית, יצוג הבית והבית הלאומי בקולנוע אוטוביוגרפי דוקומנטארי ישראלי, מאת כרמל גוטליב קמחי, יצא בהוצאת כרמל–ירושלים. 
שוקה גלוטמן, "'דומם או חי?': דיאלוג בין סטילס לקולנוע בסרטו של דוד פרלוב, 'תצלומי 1952–2002'", בתוך: רות איסקין, חיים מאור, קטרין קוג'מן–אפל (עורכים), חיים של אמנות, ירושלים: הוצאת מאגנס, 2011, עמ' 243–250, . 
אריה קרישק, לזכור את פרלוב, באתר הארץ, 26 בדצמבר 2013. 
נועה רובין, יומן יקר שלו: מירה פרלוב מספרת על דוד ועל היומנים שהפכו ליצירת מופת, באתר מעריב, 4 בדצמבר 2008. 
נירית אנדרמן, אותו חלון, באתר הארץ, 26 בדצמבר 2013. 
מרב יודילוביץ', דרך עצמו לספר ידע, באתר ידיעות אחרונות, 26 בדצמבר 2013. 
ארז שוייצר, "פגישות עם נתן זך" | מגע האצבע על העיקר, באתר הארץ, 19 בינואר 2011. 
Philippe Azoury, "Perlov Story", Libération, 21 mars 2007. 
Uri Klein, The View from Perlov. Haaretz, 19 December 2003.
Patrick Straumann, "David Perlov: Le flaneur du 14e étage", Trafic, n° 60, hiver 2006. 
Ariel Schweitzer, "David Perlov: la passion du quotidien", Les cahiers du cinéma, n° 605, Paris, octobre 2005.

External links

Diary at David Perlov's Official Website
פגישות עם נתן זך at David Perlov's Official Website
יומן מעודכן, 1990–1999 at David Perlov's Official Website
תצלומי 2002–1952 at David Perlov's Official Website

1980s avant-garde and experimental films
1983 documentary films
1983 independent films
1983 films
Biographical films about poets
Autobiographical documentary films
Documentary films about cinematography
Documentary films about families
Documentary films about immigration
Documentary films about Israel
Documentary films about London
Documentary films about Paris
Documentary films about poets
Documentary films about politicians
Documentary films about South America
Documentary films about women
Films about screenwriters
Films directed by David Perlov
Films shot in Israel
Films shot in Minas Gerais
Films shot in Rio de Janeiro (city)
Films shot in São Paulo
1980s Hebrew-language films
Israeli avant-garde and experimental films
Israeli documentary films
Israeli independent films
Self-reflexive films